Brandon Foster Jacobs (born December 8, 1990) is an American former professional baseball outfielder.

Career
The Boston Red Sox drafted Jacobs in the tenth round of the 2009 Major League Baseball Draft. Kevin Goldstein of Baseball Prospectus ranked Jacobs as the 46th best prospect in baseball prior to the 2012 season.

On July 12, 2013, Jacobs was traded to the Chicago White Sox for pitcher Matt Thornton and cash. He was ranked the #7 ranked prospect in the White Sox organization. After the trade, Jacobs played for Double-A Birmingham Barons. He finished the 2013 season combined hitting .244 in 455 at bats, 33 doubles, 13 home runs, 66 runs batted in, 44 walks, 140 strikeouts, and 12 stolen bases. After the 2013 season, Jacobs was traded to the Arizona Diamondbacks.

On January 10, 2015, Jacobs signed a minor league deal with the Kansas City Royals, but he was released during spring training. On April 10, he signed with the Traverse City Beach Bums of the independent Frontier League.

References

External links

Auburn football signee chooses pro baseball
Boston Red Sox outfield prospect Brandon Jacobs knows Springfield
Boston Red Sox minor leaguer Brandon Jacobs has roots in Western Massachusetts
Red Sox had to part with Brandon Jacobs, who could make it with White Sox
What the Red Sox gave up in outfielder Brandon Jacobs

Living people
1990 births
Baseball outfielders
Gulf Coast Red Sox players
Lowell Spinners players
Greenville Drive players
Salem Red Sox players
Portland Sea Dogs players
Birmingham Barons players
Glendale Desert Dogs players
Visalia Rawhide players
Traverse City Beach Bums players
Lincoln Saltdogs players